The Twofold Bay Telegraph, also published as the Twofold Bay and Maneroo Telegraph, was a weekly English language newspaper published in Eden, New South Wales, Australia.

History 
The paper was originally published as the Twofold Bay and Maneroo Telegraph, also known as The Two Fold Bay Telegraph. It was issued under this title for approximately 6 months until 16 October 1860. On 19 October 1860, the title changed The Twofold Bay Telegraph. The paper ceased publication  28 December 1860.

Digitisation 
The Twofold Bay Telegraph has been digitised as part of the Australian Newspapers Digitisation Program of the National Library of Australia.

See also 
 List of newspapers in New South Wales

References

External links 
 
 

Defunct newspapers published in New South Wales